Darrell Anthony Russell, Jr. (May 27, 1976 – December 15, 2005) was an American football defensive tackle for the Oakland Raiders and Washington Redskins of the National Football League (NFL). He died in a car crash near Los Angeles after being indefinitely banned from the NFL for repeated violations of the league's substance abuse policy.

Early life
Darrell Anthony Russell, Jr. was born in Pensacola, Florida. His mother, Eleanor Russell, divorced in 1986 from Darrell Anthony Russell Sr. when their only child was four years old, and moved from Florida to Southern California. Russell grew up in a rough part of San Diego just a few blocks from Lincoln Kennedy. Russell graduated from St. Augustine High School.

College career
Russell attended the University of Southern California and, after a dominant 1996 season that featured 19 tackles for loss, was taken second overall in the 1997 NFL Draft by Al Davis and the Raiders.  At , 320-pounds Russell ran the 40-yard dash in 4.8 seconds.

Professional career
Russell's seven-year, $22 million contract in 1997 was at the time the richest rookie contract ever signed in the NFL.

He went on to have 28.5 career sacks. After making the Pro Bowl in 1998 and 1999, averaging ten sacks per year, he was poised to have a dominant NFL career. However, the following season he failed a drug test, which his lawyer attributed to "second-hand smoke," and was later suspended for four games in 2001 for a second violation, this time for failing to be tested. Shortly after that, he tested positive for a banned substance and was given a one-year suspension, which effectively wiped out his 2002 season. Russell missed 1½ years while serving two league suspensions before he played in eight games in 2003 for the Washington Redskins. However, the positive drug tests kept coming, and Russell was suspended indefinitely by the league. Russell's positive drug test in 2004 was his seventh infraction of the league's drug policy. His last NFL experience was in the Tampa Bay Buccaneers training camp in 2004.

NFL statistics

Acting career
In 2002, he played as himself in an episode of The Jersey called "Coleman's Big Date" where at an Oakland Raiders football game, his date jumps into his body as Coleman Galloway (played by Jermaine Williams) jumps into a cheerleaders' body.

Personal

Death
On December 15, 2005, Russell was a passenger in a 2004 Pontiac Grand Prix driven by close friend and former USC teammate Michael Bastianelli when it veered out of control, hitting several items including a tree and a fire hydrant before hitting a parked bus.  Both men were found unconscious and taken to area hospitals, where they were pronounced dead.

References

External links

Darrell Russell profile by the Oakland Raiders

1976 births
2005 deaths
American Conference Pro Bowl players
American football defensive ends
American football defensive tackles
American sportspeople in doping cases
Doping cases in American football
Oakland Raiders players
Players of American football from San Diego
Players of American football from Pensacola, Florida
Road incident deaths in California
Tampa Bay Buccaneers players
USC Trojans football players
Washington Redskins players
Banned sportspeople
21st-century American male actors
African-American players of American football
African-American male actors
American male television actors